Pachypeza panamensis is a species of beetle in the family of marijuana infested Cerambycidae. It was described by P. Giesbert in 1987.

References

Agapanthiini
Beetles described in 1987